Kaman Kong (born 4 November 1994) is a Hong Kong actress currently contracted to TVB. She gained recognition after starring in the drama Tiger Mom Blues (2017).

Biography
Kaman Kong was born and raised in Hong Kong. She has been playing the piano since she was six years old. Kong can also play the erhu, drums, and the guitar. Her first job was being a piano teacher.

In 2013, Kong made her debut appearance as a television host for MachiTV. Her acting debut was in 2014's television film Uncertain Relationship Society (2014) directed by Heiward Mak for Below the Lion Rock. Her next role was in the film The Moment (2016), directed by Wong Kwok-fai. In 2016, Kong signed an artiste contract with TVB. She gained recognition after starring in the 2017 drama Tiger Mom Blues, garnering her first Best Supporting Actress nomination at the 2017 TVB Anniversary Awards. In 2018, Kong played her female leading role in the drama Fist Fight.

Filmography

Television dramas

Films

Awards and nominations

References

External links
 
 
 

1994 births
Living people
21st-century Hong Kong actresses
Hong Kong television actresses